Open Systems Accounting Software (OSAS) is a business accounting software package for small- to medium-sized businesses using the Microsoft Windows, Linux, and Mac OS X operating systems. It has been developed and sold since 1976 by Open Systems, Inc. of Shakopee, MN.

OSAS is currently programmed in the Java-based BBj language developed by BASIS International. The Java implementation allows installation of OSAS on a variety of platforms.

References

External links
 Official website

Accounting software